Jana Novotná and Jim Pugh were the defending champions but only Pugh competed that year with Natasha Zvereva.

Zvereva and Pugh won in the final 4–6, 6–2, 6–3 against Zina Garrison and Rick Leach.

Seeds
Champion seeds are indicated in bold text while text in italics indicates the round in which those seeds were eliminated.

Draw

Final

Top half

Bottom half

References 
 1990 Australian Open – Doubles draws and results at the International Tennis Federation

Mixed Doubles
Australian Open (tennis) by year – Mixed doubles